The Choral Synagogue in Drohobych, Lviv Oblast in Ukraine, is the most impressive of the Jewish structures in the town.

History 
It was built between 1844 and 1863. Up to 1918 it served as the Main Synagogue of Galicia within the Austro-Hungarian Empire. After World War II Drohobych belonged to the Soviet Union. The authorities converted the building to a warehouse and altered it accordingly. In later years it deteriorated. After Ukraine gained its independence it was returned to the Jewish community. Renovation started in 2014. It was completed in 2018.

Architecture 

The style of the three-story building is a variant of the then-popular Round-arch style. The entry is framed by massive pilasters, surmounted by a decorated gable. Two windows are placed above it vertically. A larger gable, crowned by the tablets of the law surrounds the entry treatment. It again is supported on pilasters capped by decorative towers. Between the pilasters are vertical rows of three windows. The edges of the building's main facade a framed again by pilasters and topped by (smaller) towers. Another set of windows fills the space between the pilasters.
This motif is repeated on all the facades, though on the N and S facades the three vertical windows are replaced by a three-story tall, round-headed window, and on the E facade, backing the Torah ark, the centre window of the three is round.

The two outer bays of the facade are stair towers, the building is actually as wide as the three central bays. The stairs lead to the two women's galleries, both of which are located above the entryway.

The main hall (the prayer hall of the men) is of the nine-bay type, a structure to be found in some synagogues of the early 17th century like the Great Suburb Synagogue in Lviv and the Great Maharsha Synagogue in Ostroh. That is four supports arranged in a square in the centre of the space visually divides it into nine units. The Bimah stood in the centre between the pillars.

See also 
 List of synagogues in Ukraine
 Drohobycz Ghetto

References

External links 

 Choral-Synagoge in Drohobytsch, polish in Virtual Shtetl

Synagogues in Ukraine
Synagogues completed in 1865
Rundbogenstil synagogues
1842 establishments in the Austrian Empire
Orthodox synagogues in Ukraine